John Curling was a member of the New Zealand Legislative Council from 1 June 1857 to 1 May 1861, when he resigned.

He was from the Hawke's Bay Region.

References 

Year of birth unknown
Year of death unknown
Members of the New Zealand Legislative Council